The 1970 Rothmans International Vancouver – Singles was an event of the 1970 Rothmans International Vancouver tennis tournament played at the PNE Agrodome in Vancouver, Canada from 29 September through 3 October 1970. Rod Laver won the singles title, defeating Roy Emerson 6–2, 6–1, 6–2 in the final.

Draw

References

External links
 ITF tournament edition details

1970 in Canadian tennis